Sir Alan William Parker  (14 February 1944 – 31 July 2020) was an English filmmaker. His early career, beginning in his late teens, was spent as a copywriter and director of television advertisements. After about ten years of filming adverts, many of which won awards for creativity, he began screenwriting and directing films.

Parker was known for using a wide range of filmmaking styles and working in differing genres. He directed musicals, including Bugsy Malone (1976), Fame (1980), Pink Floyd – The Wall (1982), The Commitments (1991) and Evita (1996); true-story dramas, including Midnight Express (1978), Mississippi Burning (1988), Come See the Paradise (1990) and Angela's Ashes (1999); family dramas, including Shoot the Moon (1982), and horrors and thrillers including Angel Heart (1987) and The Life of David Gale (2003).

His films won nineteen BAFTA awards, ten Golden Globes and six Academy Awards. His film Birdy was chosen by the National Board of Review as one of the Top Ten Films of 1984 and won the Grand Prix Spécial du Jury prize at the 1985 Cannes Film Festival. Parker was appointed a Commander of the Order of the British Empire for his services to the British film industry and knighted in 2002. He was active in both British cinema and American cinema, along with being a founding member of the Directors Guild of Great Britain and lecturing at various film schools.

In 2000, he received the Royal Photographic Society Lumière Award for major achievement in cinematography, video or animation. In 2013, he received the BAFTA Academy Fellowship Award, the highest honour the British Film Academy can give a filmmaker. Parker donated his personal archive to the British Film Institute's National Archive in 2015.

Early years
Parker was born into a working-class family in Islington, North London, the son of Elsie Ellen, a dressmaker, and William Leslie Parker, a house painter. He grew up on a council estate of Islington, which always made it easy for him to remain "almost defiantly working-class in attitudes" said the British novelist and screenwriter Ray Connolly. Parker said that although he had his share of fun growing up, he always felt he was studying for his secondary school exams, while his friends were out having a good time. He had an "ordinary background" with no aspirations to become a film director, nor did anyone in his family have any desire to be involved in the film industry. The closest he ever came, he said, to anything related to films was learning photography, a hobby inspired by his uncles: "That early introduction to photography is something I remember."

Parker attended Dame Alice Owen's School, concentrating on science in his last year. He left school when he was eighteen to work in the advertising field, hoping that the advertising industry might be a good way to meet girls.

Career

1962–1975: Early work and breakthrough 
His first job was office boy in the post room of Ogilvy & Mather an advertising agency in London. But more than anything, he said, he wanted to write, and would write essays and ads when he got home after work. His colleagues also encouraged him to write, which soon led him to a position as a copywriter in the company. Parker took jobs with different agencies over the next few years, having by then become proficient as a copywriter. One such agency was Collett Dickenson Pearce in London, where he first met the future producers David Puttnam and Alan Marshall, both of whom would later produce many of his films. Parker credited Puttnam with inspiring him and talking him into writing his first film script, Melody (1971).

By 1968, Parker had moved from copywriting to successfully directing numerous television advertisements. In 1970, he joined Marshall to establish a company to make advertisements. That company eventually became one of Britain's best commercial production houses, winning nearly every major national and international award open to it. Among their award-winning adverts were the UK Cinzano vermouth advertisement (starring Joan Collins and Leonard Rossiter), and a Heineken advert which used 100 actors. Parker credited his years writing and directing adverts for his later success as a film director: 

After writing the screenplay for the Waris Hussein film Melody in 1971, Parker shot his first fictional film titled No Hard Feelings in 1973, for which he wrote the script. The film is a bleak love story set against the Blitz in London during the Second World War, when the Luftwaffe bombed the city for 57 consecutive nights. Parker was born during one of those bombing raids, and said "the baby in that [film] could well have been me". With no feature film directing experience, he could not find financial backing, and decided to risk using his own money and funds from mortgaging his house to cover the cost. The film impressed the BBC, which bought the film and showed it on television a few years later in 1976. The BBC producer Mark Shivas had, in the interim, also contracted Parker to direct The Evacuees (1975), a Second World War story written by Jack Rosenthal which was shown as a Play for Today. The work was based on true events which involved the evacuation of school children from central Manchester. The Evacuees won a BAFTA for best TV drama and also an Emmy for best International Drama.

Parker next wrote and directed his first feature film, Bugsy Malone (1976), a parody of early American gangster films and American musicals, but with only child actors. Parker's desire in making the film was to entertain both children and adults with a unique concept and style of film:

The film received eight British Academy Award nominations and five Awards, including two BAFTAs for Jodie Foster.

1978–1990: Subsequent success 
Parker next directed Midnight Express (1978), based on a true account by Billy Hayes about his incarceration and escape from a Turkish prison for trying to smuggle hashish out of the country. Parker made the film in order to do something radically different from Bugsy Malone, which would broaden his style of filmmaking. The script was written by Oliver Stone in his first screenplay, and won Stone his first Academy Award. The music was composed by Giorgio Moroder, who was also awarded his first Oscar for the film. Midnight Express established Parker as a "front rank director", as both he and the film were Oscar nominated. The success of that film also gave him the freedom from then on to direct films of his own choosing.

Parker then directed Fame (1980), which follows the lives of eight students through their years at the New York City's High School of Performing Arts. It was a huge box-office success and led to a television spin-off series of the same name. Parker stated that after doing a serious drama like Midnight Express, he wanted to do a film with music, but very different from typical musicals of the past:

Actress Irene Cara recalls that "the nice thing about the way Alan works with everyone is that he allowed us to really feel like classmates." However, Parker was refused permission to use the actual school portrayed in the film because of the notoriety he achieved from his previous film, Midnight Express. The head of the school district told him, "Mr. Parker, we can't risk you doing for New York high schools the same thing you did for Turkish prisons."

Parker's next film was Shoot the Moon (1982), the story of a marital break-up that takes place in Northern California. Parker calls it "the first grown-up film that I'd done". He again chose to direct a subject distinctly different from his previous film, explaining, "I really try to do different work. I think that by doing different work each time, it keeps you creatively fresher." He described the theme of the film being about "two people who can't live together but who also can't let go of one another. A story of fading love, senseless rage, and the inevitable bewildering betrayal in the eyes of the children." Its stars, Albert Finney and Diane Keaton, received Golden Globe nominations for their performances.

The film also had a personal significance for Parker, who said he was forced to examine his own marriage: "It was a painful film to make for me because there were echoes of my own life in it. It was about a breakup of a marriage, and the children in the story were quite close to my own children in age. Shoot the Moon was very, very close to my own life." He spent days with the writer Bo Goldman on developing a realistic story, and states that his marriage became "infinitely stronger" as a result of the film.

Also in 1982 Parker directed a film version of the Pink Floyd conceptual rock opera, The Wall, which starred Boomtown Rats frontman Bob Geldof as the fictive rocker "Pink". Parker later described the filming as "one of the most miserable experiences of my creative life." though not a box office success, it received positive critical reviews and became a cult classic.

Parker directed Birdy (1984), starring Matthew Modine and Nicolas Cage. It recounts the story of two school friends who have returned from the Vietnam War but who were both psychologically and physically injured. Parker called it a "wonderful story" after having read the book by William Wharton. However, because of the nature of the story, he had no idea how to make it into a movie: "I didn't know if you could take the poetry of the book and make it cinematic poetry, or if an audience would actually want it."

The film became a critical success. Richard Schickel says that Parker had "transcended realism ... [and] achieved his personal best", while Derek Malcolm considers Birdy to be Parker's "most mature and perhaps his best movie". The message of the film, writes critic Quentin Falk, is "joyously life-affirming", which he notes is common to much of Parker's work. He adds that Parker's films manage to achieve a blend of "strong story and elegant frame", a style which he says typically eludes other directors who rely too much on the purely visual.

With Mississippi Burning (1988), Parker received his second Oscar nomination for Best Director. The film is based on a true story about the murders of three civil rights workers in 1964, and stars Gene Hackman and Willem Dafoe. Hackman was nominated for Best Actor, while the film was nominated for five other Oscars, including Best Picture. It won for Best Cinematography.

1991–2003: Later works
In 1991 Parker directed The Commitments, a comedy about working class Dubliners who form a soul band. The film was an international success and led to a successful sound track album. To find a cast Parker visited most of the estimated 1,200 different bands then playing throughout Dublin. He met with over 3,000 different band members. Rather than pick known actors, Parker says he chose young musicians, most of whom had no acting experience, in order to remain "truthful to the story". "I cast everybody to be very close to the character that they play in the film. They're not really playing outside of who they are as people." Parker says he wanted to make the film because he could relate to the hardships in the lives of young Dubliners, having come from a similar working-class background in north London.

Film critic David Thomson observes that with The Commitments, Parker "showed an unusual fondness for people, place, and music. It was as close as Parker has come to optimism." Parker said that it was the "most enjoyable" film he ever made.

Evita (1996), was another musical, starring Madonna, Antonio Banderas and Jonathan Pryce. Andrew Lloyd Webber and Tim Rice's score originated from the earlier musical. Parker remembers Madonna's strong desire to play the role of Evita, that "as far as she was concerned, no one could play Evita as well as she could, and she said that she would sing, dance and act her heart out, ... and that's exactly what she did". Evita was nominated for five Academy Awards, winning for Best Original Song, which was sung by Madonna.

Parker's next film was Angela's Ashes (1999), a drama based on the real-life experiences of the Irish-American teacher Frank McCourt and his childhood. His family was forced to move from the United States back to Ireland because of financial difficulties, which led to the family's problems caused by his father's alcoholism.

Colm Meaney, who acted in The Commitments, noticed the dramatic shift in theme and style of Parker's films. He said "it's the variety of his work that sort of staggers me. He can go from Evita to Angela's Ashes. He adds that "when Alan starts a project, it's going to be something very interesting and completely out of left field". Parker explained that doing a story like Angela's Ashes was simply his "reaction against a big film" like Evita. He said that he tried to avoid the "obvious movies", saying "You want the film to stay with people afterwards ... It just seems to me that the greatest crime is to make just another movie." Parker said it is important to carefully choose which films to write and direct:

Therefore, when Parker visited film schools and spoke to young filmmakers, he told them that the new film technology available for making films and telling a story is less important than conveying a message: "If you haven't got something to say, I don't think you should be a filmmaker".

British film critic Geoff Andrew described Parker as a "natural storyteller" who got his message across using "dramatic lighting, vivid characterisation, scenes of violent conflict regularly interrupting sequences of expository dialogue, and an abiding sympathy for the underdog (he is a born liberal with a keen sense of injustice)".

Parker produced and directed The Life of David Gale (2003), a crime thriller, starring Kevin Spacey and Kate Winslet. It tells the story of an advocate for the abolition of capital punishment who finds himself on death row after having been convicted of murdering a fellow activist. The film received generally poor reviews. Roger Ebert did not like the film, calling the story "silly", although he said the acting was "splendidly done".

Personal life
Parker was married twice; first to Annie Inglis from 1966 until their divorce in 1992, and then to producer Lisa Moran, to whom he was married until his death. He had five children, including screenwriter Nathan Parker.

Parker died in London on 31 July 2020 at age 76, following a lengthy illness (not believed to be related to COVID-19).

Honours and awards
Parker was nominated for eight BAFTA awards, three Golden Globes and two Oscars. He was a founding member of the Directors Guild of Great Britain and lectured at film schools around the world. In 1985, the British Academy awarded him the Michael Balcon Award for Outstanding Contribution to British Cinema. Parker was appointed Commander of the Order of the British Empire (CBE) in the 1995 Birthday Honours and Knight Bachelor in the 2002 New Year Honours for services to the film industry. In 1999 he was given the Lifetime Achievement Award by the Directors Guild of Great Britain. He became chairman of the Board of Governors of the British Film Institute (BFI) in 1998 and in 1999 was appointed the first chairman of the newly formed UK Film Council.

In 2005 Parker received an honorary Doctorate of Arts from the University of Sunderland of which his long-time associate Lord Puttnam is chancellor. In 2004 he was the Chairman of the Jury at the 26th Moscow International Film Festival. In 2013 he was awarded the BAFTA Academy Fellowship Award "in recognition of outstanding achievement in the art forms of the moving image", which is the highest honour the British Academy can bestow.

The British Film Institute (BFI) produced a tribute to Parker in September and October 2015 with an event titled "Focus on Sir Alan Parker" which included multiple screenings of his films and an on-stage interview of Parker by producer David Puttnam. The event coincided and marked the donation his entire working archive to the BFI National Archive.

Filmography

References

External links
 
 
 

1944 births
2020 deaths
BAFTA fellows
BAFTA Outstanding British Contribution to Cinema Award
Best Director BAFTA Award winners
Best Screenplay BAFTA Award winners
Filmmakers who won the Best Film BAFTA Award
English male screenwriters
Commanders of the Order of the British Empire
British copywriters
English film directors
Television commercial directors
English film producers
English screenwriters
Knights Bachelor
Officiers of the Ordre des Arts et des Lettres
People educated at Dame Alice Owen's School
People from Islington (district)
Film directors from London